The Texas Women's Hall of Fame was established in 1984 by the Governor's Commission on Women. The honorees are selected biennially from submissions from the public. The honorees must be either native Texans or a resident of Texas at the time of the nomination.

Exhibit location, hours
The Texas Women's Hall of Fame Museum is located inside Blagg-Huey Library on the Denton, Texas campus of Texas Woman's University. It houses a permanent exhibit featuring the accomplishments of each of the honorees.

Inductees

See also 

 Awards and decorations of the Texas government

References

References

Further reading

External links
 Great Texas Women
 Texas Women's Hall of Fame

Women's halls of fame
History of women in Texas
Museums in Denton County, Texas
Lists of American women
State halls of fame in the United States
Women's museums in Texas
Texas Woman's University
Halls of fame in Texas
1984 establishments in Texas
Lists of people from Texas